This is a list of mountains and hills of the Rhön, a low mountain range in the Central Uplands of Germany that straddles the three federal states of Bavaria, Hesse and Thuringia. This list includes summits within the Rhön Mountains and its foothills, taking in the Rhön Biosphere Reserve and the nature parks of the Bavarian Rhön, Hessian Rhön and, where it belongs to the Rhön, the Hessian Spessart.
The table currently shows mountains over 900 metres high.  It will be extended over time.

Six columns in the following table, which on start up is arranged by height in metres (m) above sea level (NHN datum unless otherwise stated based on ), are sortable by clicking on the symbols by their headings. In the columns "Mountain, hill, subpeak“ alternative names are given in brackets, in smaller font and italics. In these columns, where entries bear the same name they are disambiguated by the name of the municipality to which they belong shown in brackets and small font. Mountains or hills that have a low isolation or prominence and are therefore not considered independent peaks, are marked with the abbreviation "SP" for "subpeak" and their parent peak is named. In the "state" column, where a mountain or hill lies within two or more states, the state in which the actual summit lies is printed in bold.

A key to the abbreviations is at the bottom of the table.

Abbreviations 
Key to the abbreviations used in the table:

Counties (using German car registration plate abbreviations):
 FD = Fulda
 HEF = Hersfeld-Rotenburg
 KG = Bad Kissingen
 MKK = Main-Kinzig-Kreis
 NES = Rhön-Grabfeld
 SM = Schmalkalden-Meiningen
 WAK = Wartburgkreis

States:
 BV = Bavaria
 HE = Hesse
 TH = Thuringia

Biosphere Reserve:
 Rhön BR = Rhön Biosphere Reserve

Nature parks:
 Bavarian Rhön NP = Bavarian Rhön Nature Park
 Hessian Rhön NP = Hessian Rhön Nature Park
 Hessian Spessart NP = Hessian Spessart Nature Park

Points of the compass:
 NW = Northwest
 SE = Southeast

Other:
 AT = Observation tower
 BR = Biosphere reserve
 Ex = former
 DDR = East Germany
 FVV = Fremdenverkehrsverein ("tourist association")
 Gr = Groß, Großer ("Great")
 Hk = Hauptkuppe ("main summit")
 KD = Cultural monument
 Kl = Klein, Kleiner ("Little")
 km² = square kilometre
 ND = Natural monument
 NHN = Normalhöhennull (German elevation datum)
 Nk = Nebenkuppe ("subpeak")
 NP = Nature Park
 NSG = Nature reserve
 Q = Source
 RB = Regierungsbezirk ("province")
 TrÜbPl = Military training area
 v = von, vom
 Whs = Wirtshaus (pub, cafe, restaurant)

References and footnotes 

Rhon
Rhon
!